Montclair Film is a nonprofit that organizes the annual Montclair Film Festival (MFF). The festival is held between early-April to late-May in Montclair, New Jersey. The festival showcases new works from American and international filmmakers. Films are programmed based on categories including: Fiction, Non-Fiction, World Cinema, Short, and Student Filmmaking.

Notable advisory board members include J.J. Abrams, Jonathan Alter, Stephen Colbert, Abigail Disney, Olympia Dukakis, Chiwetel Ejiofor, Emma Freud, Laura Linney, Jon Stewart, Julie Taymor, and Patrick Wilson.

History
The film festival was founded by WNET-TV Vice President and General Counsel Bob Feinberg. Feinberg hired festival programmer Thom Powers and director Raphaela Neihausen, and developed the Board of Directors composed of Montclair residents. The board includes film and media professionals, philanthropists and community leaders.

Editions

MFF 2012: Inaugural festival 
The festival's inaugural event attracted 5,000 - 7,500 attendees and programmed over 45 films. Notable attendees included Oliver Platt, Kathleen Turner, Olympia Dukakis, Patrick Wilson, Michael Moore and author Judy Blume. Film featured included The Oranges, Your Sister’s Sister, 2 Days in New York and Robot and Frank. The MFF won the award for Favorite Film Festival at the 2012 Discover Jersey Arts People's Choice Awards.

MFF 2013
The second festival was held across several venues in Montclair and attracted more than 14,000 attendees. It programmed over 80 films and events. A favorite film category was established in an effort to provide a platform for established and lesser-known filmmakers from New Jersey. Prominent guests included Michael Moore, Harry Belafonte,  Darlene Love, Lake Bell, Ice-T, Alex Gibney and New York Times culture columnist David Carr.Films screened included 20 Feet From Stardom, The Attack, Blackfish, Frances Ha, The Act of Killing, The Spectacular Now, Dirty Wars, In A World..., The Kings of Summer, Computer Chess, Still Mine, Stories We Tell and Valley of Saints.

Notable guests included Michael Moore, Harry Belafonte, Darlene Love, Lake Bell, Ice-T, Alex Gibney and New York Times culture columnist David Carr.

MFF 2014
The third festival featured the film Chef, with Jon Favreau.

MFF 2015
The fourth festival's introductory film was Hello, My Name Is Doris with Sally Field. It additionally featured Time Out of Mind with Richard Gere.

MFF 2016 
The fifth festival opened with Roger Ross Williams' film Life, Animated.  Following the film, a panel discussion was held with Advisory Board Member Stephen Colbert, members of the Suskind family, film creators, and Gilbert Gottfried, who appeared in the film. The festival closed with the film Miss Sharon Jones!, documenting the story of Sharon Jones and The Dap-Kings as Jones fought cancer

MFF 2020 
The ninth festival's opening film was Nomadland. MFF additionally featured One Night in Miami, Ammonite and Derek DelGaudio’s In & Of Itself. Lee Isaac Chung's Minari was selected as the virtual centerpiece film. The festival was postponed and held primarily remotely as a result of the Covid-19 pandemic.

Year-Round Programming 
Montclair Film additionally holds educational programs and events for the public. These events are programmed throughout the year. Past events include: the Free Summer Series Under the Stars; the Kidz Shortz Filmmaking Competition and Workshop for youths; free African American Heritage Month screenings; the Underdog Festival at Montclair State University, featuring screenings of Oscar-nominated shorts; the Behind the Screen: Media Career Day for high school and university students; the Festival Poster Competition; networking events for industry insiders and newcomers; a celebrity fundraiser (with Advisory Board Member Stephen Colbert), and an Oscars’ Eve Party.

Past Award Winners

Montclair Film Festival Fiction Feature Award 
2019 – Monos, directed by Alejandro Landes

2018 – First Reformed, directed by Paul Schrader

Sinofsky Award for Documentary Feature 
2019 – Honeyland, directed by Ljubomir Stefanov and Tamara Kotevska

2018 – Hale County This Morning, This Evening, directed by RaMell Ross

The David Carr Award For Truth In Non-Fiction Filmmaking 
2019 – Mossville: When Great Trees Fall, directed by Alexander Glustrom

2018 – Dark Money, directed by Kimberly Reed

The Inaugural Mark Urman Award For Fiction Filmmaking 
2019 – Mickey and the Bear, directed by Annabelle Attanasio

New Jersey Films Award 
2019 – Life with Layla, directed by Ken Spooner and Mike Mee

2018 – Crime + Punishment, directed by Stephen Tiang

Audible Storyteller Award 
2019 – Mickey and the Bear, directed by Annabelle Attanasio

Junior Jury Award 
2019 – Mossville: When Great Trees Fall, directed by Alexander Glustrom

2018 – American Animals, directed by Bart Layton

References

External links
 

2012 establishments in New Jersey
Film festivals in New Jersey
Montclair, New Jersey
Film festivals established in 2012